Arennest is a hill in Hesse, Germany. It is located nearby Biedenkopf and is covered with forest.

References

Hills of Hesse
Mountains and hills of the Rhenish Massif